The 2008 IIHF World U20 Championship, commonly referred to as the 2008 World Junior Ice Hockey Championships (2008 WJHC), was the 32nd edition of the Ice Hockey World Junior Championship. The elite group, what the IIHF refer to as the Top Division, was held in Pardubice and Liberec, Czech Republic, between 26 December 2007 and 5 January 2008. Canada won the gold medal for the fourth consecutive time. Sweden earned its first World Junior medal since 1996 by reaching the final.

Top Division

Venues

Rosters

Preliminary round 
All times are local (UTC+1).

Group A

Group B

Relegation round

Final round

Bracket

Quarterfinals

Fifth place game

Semifinals

Bronze medal game

Final

Statistics

Scoring leaders

GP = Games played; G = Goals; A = Assists; Pts = Points; +/− = Plus-minus; PIM = Penalties In MinutesSource: IIHF

Goaltending leaders 
(minimum 40% team's total ice time)

TOI = Time on ice (minutes:seconds); GA = Goals against; GAA = Goals against average; SA = Shots against; Sv% = Save percentage; SO = ShutoutsSource: IIHF

Awards
Best players selected by the Directorate:
Best Goaltender:  Steve Mason
Best Defenceman:  Drew Doughty
Best Forward:  Viktor Tikhonov
MVP:  Steve Mason
Source: IIHF

Media All-Stars:
Goaltender:  Steve Mason
Defencemen:  Victor Hedman /  Drew Doughty
Forwards:  Patrik Berglund /  Viktor Tikhonov /  James van Riemsdyk
Source: IIHF

Final standings

Division I 

The Division I Championships were played from 9 to 15 December 2007 in Bad Tölz, Germany (Group A), and from 12 to 18 December 2007 in Riga, Latvia (Group B).

Group A

Group B

Division II 

The Division II Championships were played from 9 to 15 December 2007 in Canazei, Italy (Group A), and from 10 to 16 December 2007 in Tallinn, Estonia (Group B).

Group A

Group B

Division III 

The Division III Championship was played from 16 to 24 January 2008 in Belgrade, Serbia.

See also 
 2008 World Junior Ice Hockey Championships
 2008 World Junior Ice Hockey Championships – Division I
 2008 World Junior Ice Hockey Championships – Division II
 2008 World Junior Ice Hockey Championships – Division III
 2008 World Junior Ice Hockey Championships rosters

References

External links 
 IIHF official website

 
Junior, World 2008
2008
World Junior Ice Hockey Championships, 2008
2008
Youth ice hockey in the Czech Republic
World Junior Ice Hockey Championships
World Junior Ice Hockey Championships
Sport in Liberec
Sports competitions in Pardubice